Reginald Guy Cowan (August 1, 1884 – March 10, 1957) was an American potter and designer. He founded Cowan Pottery and was a leading figure in the Cleveland School of artists.

External links
 Entry for R. Guy Cowan on the Union List of Artist Names
 Biography on the website of the Cowan Pottery Museum

1884 births
1957 deaths
Alfred Saxons football coaches
American ceramists
Artists from Cleveland
Cleveland School (arts community)
People from East Liverpool, Ohio
20th-century ceramists
New York State College of Ceramics alumni